The cricket competitions at the 2017 Southeast Asian Games in Kuala Lumpur took place at Kinrara Oval in Selangor.

The 2017 Games featured competitions in three events (men 2 events and women 1 events).

Competition schedule

Participation

Participating nations

Men's competition

Twenty20 competition

50 over competition

Women's competition

Twenty20 competition

Medal summary

Medal table
 Host nation (Malaysia)

Men's event

Women's event

References

External links
 

 
 
2017 in cricket